The M'pozo is a river in the province of Bas-Congo in the Democratic Republic of the Congo. Its source is located in Angola and it forms part of the Angola–Democratic Republic of the Congo border. The river ends on the left bank of the Congo River, a few kilometres upstream of Matadi.

The river is especially known for the lower part of its course and for its canyon, which is used by the Matadi–Kinshasa Railway, and which constituted the principal difficulty during the construction of this railway line at the end of the 19th century.

References

Rivers of Angola
Rivers of the Democratic Republic of the Congo
International rivers of Africa
Border rivers
Angola–Democratic Republic of the Congo border